EVE (introduced as the Extensible VAX Editor, later as the Extensible Versatile Editor) is a flexible text editor that is part of the VMS operating system. EVE is implemented by using the Text Processing Utility (TPU).

The Emacs editor features an EVE emulation (as an add-on).

Editor control
EVE is invoked via:
 $ EDIT/TPU filename

Since the EVE editor was designed for use from a VT100 or VT220 terminal, many keyboard conventions introduced for personal computers do not work.

Key Function Definitions

Interactive Key Definitions 

To assign a command or function to a key or key combination, use the following procedure:

 Enter the EVE command line (using the - key on the numeric keypad or Ctrl-B Ctrl-U)
 Enter the Define Key command—as almost everywhere in OpenVMS the text is case insensitive and it is possible to use abbreviations, so entering de k will do
 When the EVE command: prompt occurs, enter the name of the command
 When the Press the key you want to define: prompt occurs, press the key or key combination which is to call the given command

Key Definitions in a File 

EVE upon its start interprets the EVE$INIT.EVE file in the user's current or home directory. When the SYS$LOGIN:EVE$INIT.EVE file contains

 DEFINE KEY= Ctrl/F   Find
 DEFINE KEY= F3       Find Next
 DEFINE KEY= F1       Help
 DEFINE KEY= F2       Do

the Ctrl-F key would call string search function, the F3 key repeating of the last search, the F1 key would display the list of EVE commands and the F2 key would call the EVE command line.

Features
Automatic journaling facilitates recovering "all or most" of one's editing.

The TWO WINDOWS command allows editing more than one file at a time (split screen).

References

External links
 Extensible Versatile Editor Reference Manual, HP OpenVMS Systems Documentation

OpenVMS text editors